Gladys Lucy Adshead (April 25, 1896 – 1985) was a British-born writer of children's books.

Biography

Adshead was born in Manchester, England, to James Frederick and Bertha Wilson Groome Adshead. She was educated at Froebel Educational Institute, a teacher training college. She became a teacher and headmistress in private schools in England, where she was a member of the Royal Society of Teachers, and later in Maryland, Massachusetts, and Illinois in the United States.

Gladys Adshead was best known for her "Brownie" books, the first of which was published in 1938 by Oxford University Press and entitled Brownies - Hush! and illustrated by Elizabeth Orton Jones. Jones also illustrated Adshead's 1945 book What Miranda Knew.

In 1947, Adshead collaborated with George H. Shapiro, with her writing the lyrics and Shapiro writing the music for songs in Seventeen to Sing. She worked with Annis Duff to assemble poems for children in a collection called An Inheritance of Poetry; the book was one of fourteen noted as distinguished books in 1948 by the Children's Library Association.

She died in Alameda County, California in 1985.

Selected works

See also
 Brownie (folklore)

References

External links

Gladys Adshead correspondence at the Maine State Library
Gladys L. Adshead papers at the University of Oregon

Bibliography
Commire, Anne.  Something About the Author, Volume 3.  Gale Research 1972

1896 births
1985 deaths
Alumni of the University of Roehampton
British children's writers
Women heads of schools in the United Kingdom
Writers from Manchester
British emigrants to the United States